Letholycus is a genus of marine ray-finned fishes belonging to the family Zoarcidae, the eelpouts. This is a small genus with only two species found in the southwestern Atlantic Ocean.

Species
Letholycus contains the following two species:

References

Lycodinae
Taxa described in 1988